Church Mouth is the second studio album by American rock band Portugal. The Man. It was released on July 20, 2007 in Europe and on July 24, 2007 in the UK and the USA. As of June 22, 2007, the album had leaked to p2p networks. Regarding the leak, the band posted the following message on their MySpace bulletins:
"Go download it. Give yourself the tastes. Feel free."

Track listing

A limited edition of the album was released exclusively in Germany. It featured the It's Complicated Being a Wizard EP as a bonus disc.

Personnel
Portugal. The Man
John Baldwin Gourley - guitars, lead vocals, synthesizers, programming
Zachary Scott Carothers - bass, backing vocals, percussion
Jason Sechrist - drums, backing vocals, congas, percussion
Additional personnel
Casey Bates - production, guitar, backing vocals, percussion
Kirk Huffman - guitar, percussion
Dewey Halpaus - backing vocals
Phillip Peterson - cello, backing vocals
Kyle O'Quin – keyboards, percussion
Thomas Hunter - percussion

References

2007 albums
Portugal. The Man albums
Fearless Records albums